Nick DeMartino (born June 15, 1948) is an American businessman and the former Senior Vice President of Media and Technology for the American Film Institute (AFI). With AFI, DeMartino oversaw digital ventures.

Early career
DeMartino holds a Bachelor of Arts degree from the University of Louisville and a Master of Arts in media studies from Antioch College. As a television producer, DeMartino has produced TV documentaries about nuclear power, abortion, and comedy, among other topics.

For the Labor Institute of Public Affairs, a media production and distribution unit for organized labor, DeMartino developed and managed a $20 million advertising and communications program, teleconferences, training programs and a cable television service. DeMartino subsequently founded the Washington Community Video Center and TeleVISIONS Magazine. As principal staff writer for the Carnegie Commission on the Future of Public Broadcasting, he wrote their report and follow-up study titled Keeping PACE with the New Television. DeMartino recommended the creation of a Fund for Independent Television, the prototype for ITVS.

AFI
Under DeMartino's leadership, AFI led a number of initiatives that influenced how digital media might best be employed within the worlds of entertainment and education.

In 1990, DeMartino joined AFI to direct the Cinetex trade show, conference, and film festival.

Awards and honors
 1995, Los Angeles Business Journal named DeMartino a leader in the technology industry.
 1999, DeMartino named one of twenty leaders in broadband technology by the Los Angeles Business Journal.
 2006, ranked number 3 in the "Digital 50" compiled by The Hollywood Reporter and the Producers Guild of America's New Media Council.
 Recipient of the INDIE award from ITVS for service to independent producers.

American business executives
Living people
1948 births
University of Louisville alumni
Antioch College alumni